Shelby Township may refer to:

Indiana
 Shelby Township, Jefferson County, Indiana
 Shelby Township, Ripley County, Indiana
 Shelby Township, Shelby County, Indiana
 Shelby Township, Tippecanoe County, Indiana

Iowa
 Shelby Township, Shelby County, Iowa, in Shelby County, Iowa

Michigan
 Shelby Charter Township, Macomb County, Michigan
 Shelby, Oceana County, Michigan

Minnesota
 Shelby Township, Blue Earth County, Minnesota

South Dakota
 Shelby Township, Brown County, South Dakota, in Brown County, South Dakota

See also
Shelby (disambiguation)

Township name disambiguation pages